Tiger Walk is an album by Robben Ford. "In the Beginning" was nominated for a 1998 Grammy Award for Best Rock Instrumental Performance.

Track listing
All tracks composed by Robben Ford; except where indicated	
 "In the Beginning" – 	5:13
 "Ghosts" – 	5:27
 "Freedom" – 	6:43
 "Red Lady w/Cello" – 	5:00
 "Oasis" – 	5:10
 "Just Like It Is" – 	3:07
 "I Can't Stand the Rain" (Don Bryant, Bernard Miller, Ann Peebles) – 	3:31
 "The Champ" – 	5:12
 "Tiger Walk" – 	5:19
 "Comin' Up" – 	4:54
 "Don't Let the Sun Catch You Crying" (hidden track) -	        8:39
 "Chevrolet" (hidden track) -	        5:47

Personnel
 Robben Ford – guitar
 Benmont Tench – organ
 Charley Drayton – bass guitar
 Steve Jordan – percussion, drums
 Lenny Castro – percussion

Guests
 Bob Malach – tenor saxophone
 Ronnie Cuber – baritone saxophone
 Bernie Worrell – organ, clavinet
 Russell Ferrante – piano

References

1997 albums
Robben Ford albums
Albums produced by Niko Bolas